"Because You Move Me" is a song by Dutch electronic music group Tinlicker and Dutch DJ Thomas Helsloot. While originally released in 2017, the music video was released in February 2021, which resulted in renewed interest in the song.
 The song reached the top 20 in Germany in Switzerland, and the top 30 in Austria. In March 2022, it was certified Gold in Canada.

Music video
Filmed in Alberta, Canada, the video features an ice skater on a frozen lake.

Charts

Weekly charts

Year-end charts

Certifications

References

2017 songs